The 2020–21 Colorado Buffaloes women's basketball team represented the University of Colorado Boulder during the 2020–21 NCAA Division I women's basketball season. The Buffaloes, were led by fifth year head coach JR Payne, played their home games at the CU Events Center and are a member of the Pac-12 Conference.

The Buffaloes finished the season 12–11, 8–8 in Pac-12 play to finish in sixth place.  In the Pac-12 Tournament they were upset by eleventh seed Washington in the First Round.  They received an at-large bid to the WNIT.  They defeated Louisiana and Nebraska before losing to Ole Miss in the Quarterfinals to end their season.

Previous season 
The Buffaloes finished the season 16–14, 5–13 in Pac-12 play to finish in a tie for ninth place. As the tenth seed in the Pac-12 women's tournament they lost to USC in the First Round.  The NCAA tournament and WNIT were cancelled due to the COVID-19 outbreak.

Roster

Schedule
Source: 

|-
!colspan=9 style=| Regular season

|-
!colspan=9 style=|  Pac-12 Women's Tournament

|-
!colspan=9 style=|  WNIT

Rankings
2020–21 NCAA Division I women's basketball rankings

Note: The Coaches Poll does not release a Week 2 poll, and the AP poll does not release a poll after the NCAA Tournament.

See also
2020–21 Colorado Buffaloes men's basketball team

References

Colorado Buffaloes women's basketball seasons
Colorado
Colorado Buffaloes
Colorado Buffaloes
2021 Women's National Invitation Tournament participants